Paul G. Ruane (July 31, 1933 – August 23, 2000) was a former Republican member of the Pennsylvania House of Representatives.

References

Republican Party members of the Pennsylvania House of Representatives
1933 births
2000 deaths
20th-century American politicians